South West Staffordshire was a parliamentary constituency in Staffordshire.  It returned one Member of Parliament (MP) to the House of Commons of the Parliament of the United Kingdom, elected by the first past the post system.

History

The constituency was created for the February 1974 general election, and abolished for the 1983 general election.

Boundaries 
The Rural Districts of Cannock and Seisdon.

Members of Parliament

Election results

References 

Parliamentary constituencies in Staffordshire (historic)
Constituencies of the Parliament of the United Kingdom established in 1974
Constituencies of the Parliament of the United Kingdom disestablished in 1983